Peter Flood  was an Irish priest and educator. A native of Legan, Co. Longford, Flood received his seminary education in Paris, gaining an MA(1774) and LTh(1780). Dr Flood became Professor of Theology, first, at the College de Navarre and later the College des Lombards, as the Irish College in Paris was based at.

Dr Flood was in Paris during the September Massacres of 1792 and narrowly escaped death; he returned home and became Parish Priest of Edgeworthstown, Co. Longford. He served as President of St. Patrick's College, Maynooth from 1798 to 1803, where he worked on the development of the College during its formative years and the upheaval of the 1798 Rebellion.

References

18th-century Irish Roman Catholic priests
Presidents of St Patrick's College, Maynooth
People from County Longford
Year of birth missing
Year of death missing
19th-century Irish Roman Catholic priests